Kheymeh Sar (also Romanized as Khīmah Sar) is a village in Gil Dulab Rural District, in the Central District of Rezvanshahr County, Gilan Province, Iran. At the 2006 census, its population was 496, in 125 families.

References 

Populated places in Rezvanshahr County